Sigrid Milfrid Sundby (13 July 1942 – 24 July 1977) was a Norwegian speed skater who competed internationally in the 1960s and 1970s. 

She competed at the Winter Olympics in 1968, 1972 and 1976. Her best Olympic results were 4th in the 1500 metres, 6th in 500 metres, and 6th in 1000 metres at the 1968 Winter Olympics in Grenoble. She received a bronze medal at the World Allround Speed Skating Championships for Women in 1970.

Sundby dominated women's skating nationally for about a decade, winning the Norwegian allround championships in 1963, 1964, 1965, 1966, 1967, 1968, 1969, 1970 and 1973.

References

External links 
 

1942 births
1977 deaths
Norwegian female speed skaters
Speed skaters at the 1968 Winter Olympics
Speed skaters at the 1972 Winter Olympics
Speed skaters at the 1976 Winter Olympics
Olympic speed skaters of Norway
World Allround Speed Skating Championships medalists